These are the lists of the music artists that have the highest certified record sales in Finland (and/or sales explicitly confirmed by Musiikkituottajat – IFPI Finland in their database). The lists consist of albums and singles (vinyl, CD, digital) and music DVDs, certified or confirmed by Musiikkituottajat.

Musiikkituottajat deals in sales of digital and physical albums and singles and music DVDs. Excepting some sales figures of uncertified records given by Musiikkituottajat from the 2000s, these best-seller lists are largely based on total accumulated certifications given per artist and therefore may not reflect the true physical and digital sales obtained by these artists,—that is, the combined sales of uncertified records before the 2000s, those uncertified in and after the 2000s and certified sales of all time. Since the release of the October 3, 2007, Singles Chart, digital downloads of tracks have been included in the singles sales figures.

These lists exclude certifications of recordings by artists in collaboration with others as part of a single artist's total.

All musical entities

Soloists

Bands

Male soloists

Female soloists

Notes
 A When the certified records were released, Morissette had only the Canadian citizenship.

See also
List of best-selling music artists
List of best-selling albums in Finland
List of best-selling singles in Finland

References

Finnish music
Finland